Hafizullah Khaled is an Afghan Austrian humanitarian, peace activist, writer and founder of the Help Afghan School Children Organization (HASCO) based in Vienna (Austria).

HASCO is a not-for-profit, non-political Organization dedicated to assisting Afghan new returnees and displaced families send their children into school. Hafizullah Khaled has devoted himself to spreading the message of Peace and to assisting the vulnerable children of Afghanistan. During the last ten years Khaled has travelled several times to different part of Afghanistan in order to assist orphans and disadvantaged children and promote non-violent education for Afghan children.

Khaled has numerous articles and poems in both Afghan Official languages (Pashto and Persian). His poems spread the message of peace among Afghans to defend the rights of disadvantaged children. Some of his poems such as “Children the Flowers of our Garden” (Pashto poem),”Curse on war” ای جنګ لعنتی (Persian poem),"Why this continued war?"  چرا این جنگ بی پایان (Persian poem), and "My dream" زما ارمان (Pashto poem) have appeared on several Afghan web sites and publications.

Khaled received his Licentiate's degree in Law and Political science from Kabul University and has worked as liaison Officer to the United Nations Good Offices Mission in Afghanistan and Pakistan (UNGOMAP) and Office of the UN Secretary General in Afghanistan and Pakistan (OSGAP) with Mr. Benon Sevan's team in late 1980s. Mr. Benon Sevan was a special envoy representative of United Nation Secretary General in Afghanistan. He was assigned to transfer power peacefully to a neutral interim government in Afghanistan. His peace plan was blocked in the last days of its implementation.

In July 2007, Hafizullah Khaled was appointed as "Person Of the Month" by the University-Community Partnership for Social Action Research Network for his role in assisting Afghan poor children and promoting education in Afghanistan. Other personalities including Nobel Peace Prize Winner Shirin Ebadi from Iran, Muhammad Yunus Khan from Bangladesh and Wangari Maathai were also appointed as "Person Of the Month" by University-Community Partnership for Social Action Research Network.

On the eve of the September 2009 International Day of Peace, Hafizullah Khaled published a collection of his poems entitled “The Message of Peace”;the poems and articles in this book devoted to promote Peace and stability in war-torn Afghanistan. The proceeds from the sale of the book has spent to promote education of Afghan children and assist Afghan orphans and needy school children.

Khaled has written his monograph about military expenditures in the world where he explained the need for reducing huge military expenditures and spending these resources for social and economic development such as building schools for children, health facilities and supplying drinking water for poor people all over the world.

In recent years, Hafizullah Khaled has aligned with many different Afghanistan-related organizations for the betterment of the Afghan people. His focus is mainly on children's right, welfare and establishing peaceful nations.

In May 2016 Khaled has published another Peace promoting book (Pen & Gun) a collection of  anti war and violence Dari and Pashto poetries, in his new book Khaled  encourage Afghans particular young generation to educate themselves  and use Pen and book instead of Gen and bullet  which  destroying  their country.

More than thirty years conflict and bloodsheds spread widely the culture of war and violence among Afghans, in such environment peace promoting publications are needed to encourage the message of peace, tolerance and peaceful coexistence in Afghan society.

Addition to humanitarian activities writing poems and articles, Mr. Khaled also interested growing flowers and trees during his free time. According to the Guinness world record 2022 Mr.Hafizullah Khaled is holder of the world tallest rose bush with 8. 705 m, verified on 17 October 2020 in Vienna, Austria. Mr. Khaled believes that COVID-19 quarantine can never prevent us from achieving greater success, it makes me feel more confient and I realized that age is no barrier to achieving great success. He added “ For me bush rose is a symbol of beauty, friendship and love”.

External links 
 Guinness World Records 
 Help Afghan School Children Org (HASCO)
 Afghan German Online 
 University Community for Social Action 

Living people
Afghan activists
21st-century Afghan poets
Year of birth missing (living people)
Afghan writers
Male poets
21st-century male writers